David Andrew McIntosh Parra (born 17 February 1973) is a retired Venezuelan footballer who played as a centre back. McIntosh also has been capped for the Venezuela national team in two Copa América editions by Eduardo Borrero and José Omar Pastoriza as coach.

In October 2019, 41-year old McIntosh announced his retirement.

Honours

Club
ACD Lara
 Torneo de Clausura (1): 2012

References

External links
 
 McIntosh at Football Lineups
 David McIntosh at Footballdatabase

1973 births
Living people
People from Ciudad Bolívar
Venezuelan footballers
Venezuela international footballers
1997 Copa América players
1999 Copa América players
Association football defenders
Minervén S.C. players
Zulia F.C. players
Caracas FC players
Trujillanos FC players
Carabobo F.C. players
Aragua FC players
Deportivo Miranda F.C. players
Asociación Civil Deportivo Lara players
Deportivo Italia players
Atlético Venezuela C.F. players
Metropolitanos FC players
Deportivo Anzoátegui players
Venezuelan Primera División players